"Geki" was the racing pseudonym of Giacomo Russo (23 October 1937 – 18 June 1967), who was a racing driver from Italy.  An experienced driver in the Italian lower formulae, he also participated in three Formula One Italian Grands Prix from 1964–66, failing to qualify for the 1964 race, driving a Brabham for Rob Walker. For his two Grand Prix starts, he drove for Team Lotus. He scored no championship points.

However, he was a four-time Italian Formula Three series champion, winning consecutive championships from 1961 to 1964.

He was killed in a horrific accident in an Italian Formula Three race at Caserta in 1967. After an accident involving Beat Fehr, Andrea Saltari and Franco Foresti, Fehr ran down the track to warn the oncoming racers of the damaged cars and oil on the track ahead. The next group of cars included Geki, Massimo Natili, Jürg Dubler, Romano "Tiger" Perdomi and Corrado Manfredini who were unable to avoid colliding with the wreckage on the track. Geki's Matra then crashed into a wall and he was killed instantly. Fehr was struck by one of the cars and was also killed, and Perdomi died in hospital eight days later.

Complete Formula One results
(key)

References

External links

Italian racing drivers
Italian Formula One drivers
Racing drivers who died while racing
1937 births
1967 deaths
Sport deaths in Italy
Rob Walker Racing Team Formula One drivers
Team Lotus Formula One drivers
World Sportscar Championship drivers
Pseudonyms